Dalriada School is a mixed voluntary grammar school in Ballymoney, Northern Ireland. The school draws its pupils from a wide geographical area and a range of social, religious and cultural backgrounds. In 2008 the school won the Northern Ireland State Secondary School of the Year award from The Sunday Times.

Past headmasters

(as Ballymoney Intermediate school)

Rev. J.B Armour (1878–83)
John Steward (1883–84)
J.M Stronge (1884-84)
James Dick (1884–85)
William Beare (1885-1901)
John Ramsey (1901–17)
John Christy (1906–17)
Jeannie McNeil (1906–24)
(as Sandleford)
Jeannie McNeil (1924–31)
Alfred Ross (1931–39)
(as Dalriada School, Ballymoney)
Alfred Ross (1939–48)
G. Edmund Gordon (1948–75)
Alan Reynolds (1975–87)
William Calvert (1987-2003)
Derek Boyd (2003–07)
Thomas Skelton (2007–Present)

Present day

Choirs 
The school has seen success with its choirs, its Chamber Choir winning the BBC Ulster School Choir Of The Year Competition in 2016.

Drama
Dalriada has traditionally staged an annual Shakespearean production. This was altered in 1975 by the new Head of English, Roy Alcorn, to include modern plays and musicals. Productions staged in recent years have included Les Misérables, Arthur Miller's The Crucible, Oliver!,"Phantom Of The Opera", Oklahoma!, "Macbeth", and “Hairspray” with “Fiddler on the Roof” being performed in December 2018

Debating

In 2010/2011, the Society entered the UK Wide Debating Matters Championship. A team of six debaters won the Derry Qualifying Heat to make it through the Northern Ireland and Scotland final in Edinburgh, where they triumphed over schools from across the two countries. This allowed them to then qualify for the National Final held at the Royal Society of Medicine where they were defeated in a debate on the Banning of the Burqa.

Bar Mock
Dalriada also competes in the annual Bar Mock Trial Competition. The team prepares mock legal cases for the regional finals each year in the Royal Courts of Justice in Belfast, winning this competition three times. After winning the National Championships in London in 2016 for the first time, Dalriada pupils went on to compete in the Empire Mock Trial World Championships in New York for the third time. At this event Dalriada had the experience of litigating in a different jurisdiction, and a student received an award for Outstanding Witness.

Notable alumni

 Martyn Lewis; presenter, foreign correspondent and newsreader for BBC News and ITN. 
 Gordon Lyons; DUP MLA for East Antrim.
 Bridget McKeever; a former Ireland women's field hockey international. McKeever later became a PE teacher at Dalriada.
 Stewart Moore; an Irish rugby union player, who plays centre for Ulster. 
 Katie Mullan; captained Ireland at the 2018 Women's Hockey World Cup when they won the silver medal.
 Angela Platt;  a former goalkeeper with both the Ireland women's national field hockey team and the Northern Ireland women's national football team.
 James McCormick; Ulster Rugby academy player, and Ireland Rugby player, debuting on the under-20 squad at the 2022 Six Nations.

References

External links
Dalriada School website
Website and Forums for Former Dalriads

Educational institutions established in 1878
Grammar schools in County Antrim
1878 establishments in Ireland
Ballymoney